Lonepinella is a Gram-negative, facultatively anaerobic and tannase-producing genus of bacteria from the family of Pasteurellaceae with one known species (Lonepinella koalarum). Lonepinella koalarum has been isolated from the faeces of koalas.

References

Pasteurellales
Bacteria genera
Monotypic bacteria genera